Lorenzo Thomas (August 31, 1944 – July 4, 2005) was an American poet and critic. He was born in the Republic of Panama and grew up in New York City, where his family immigrated in 1948. In 1973, Thomas moved to Houston, Texas. Thomas had a two decade career as a professor at the University of Houston–Downtown.

Early life 
Thomas was born in Panama to Afro-Caribbean parents. His father, a pharmacist, was from Saint Vincent and his mother, Luzmilda, a community activist, was Jamaican, born in Costa Rica. Her sister Sadie Clemencia Dolphy was the mother of musician Eric Dolphy. As a child in NYC, he attended Duke Ellington Elementary School (P.S. 140;)  Edgar D. Shimer Junior High School (P.S. 142;) and Andrew Jackson High School.

Thomas was a graduate of Queens College in New York with a B.A. in English Literature, and minor in History & Communication Arts (Radio and Television.) He pursued graduate work towards an M.L.S. at the Pratt Institute. During his years in New York, he joined the Umbra Workshop, and was one of the youngest members. The Umbra Workshop drew young writers to the Lower East Side of New York City in search of their artistic voices. It served as a crucible for emerging black poets, among them Ishmael Reed, David Henderson and Calvin C. Hernton. The workshop was one of the currents that fed the Black Arts Movement of the '60s and '70s, the first major African-American artistic movement after the Harlem Renaissance.

Naval service

From 1968 to 1972 Thomas served in the U.S. Navy, attaining the rate of 2nd Class Petty Office (E-5) Radioman. He served in Vietnam (in-country); attended Navy schools for electronics, radio, and Vietnamese language; had experience as a platoon leader, radio and computer operator, master-at-arms, and supervisor of civilian employees. He was honorably discharged in 1972.

Career 
In 1973, Thomas moved to Houston as writer-in-residence at Texas Southern University. At Texas Southern, he helped edit the journal Roots. Beginning in 1984 and for more than two decades as a professor of English at the University of Houston–Downtown. From 1973 to 1979 he served as Writer in Residence at Texas Southern University, Florida A & M University; the State of Arkansas; and the state of Oklahoma.

Thomas also made important contributions to the study of African-American literature.

In 2000, he published Extraordinary Measures: Afrocentric Modernism and 20th-Century American Poetry, his overview of the work of James Fenton and Amiri Baraka, among others.

Death 
Thomas died in July 2005 at Texas Medical Center Hospice from emphysema.

Works and publications

Early Prizes
1963 - Dwight L. Durling Prize in Poetry, John Golden Award for Creative Writing
1966 - Poets Foundation Award
1973 - Committee on Poetry grant
1974 - Poets Foundation Award
1974 - Lucille Medwick Award
2000 - Foundation for Contemporary Arts Grants to Artists award

References

Further reading

External links
 Lorenzo Thomas at Electronic Poetry Center
 Lorenzo Thomas at PennSound

1944 births
2005 deaths
African-American poets
American male poets
University of Houston–Downtown faculty
20th-century American poets
American Book Award winners
20th-century American male writers
Andrew Jackson High School (Queens) alumni
20th-century African-American writers
21st-century African-American people
African-American male writers